Through Alien Eyes is a science fiction novel by Amy Thomson published in 1999 by Ace Books, the sequel to The Color of Distance. The story follows two aliens who return to Earth with the human protagonist from The Color of Distance.

References

External links 
 

1999 American novels
1999 science fiction novels
American science fiction novels
Novels by Amy Thomson
Ace Books books